Castanopsis cuspidata (Japanese chinquapin; Japanese tsuburajii, 円椎) is a species of Castanopsis native to southern Japan and southern Korea.

It is a medium-sized evergreen tree growing to 20–30 m tall, related to beech and oak. The leaves are 5–9 cm long and 2–4 cm broad, leathery in texture, with an entire or irregularly toothed margin. It grows in woods and ravines, especially near the sea. 

The cotyledon of the nut is eaten boiled or roasted.

Its dead wood serves as host to many mushroom types, including the shiitake, which literally means Castanopsis mushroom.

Gallery

References

External links
  (enter "Castanopsis cuspidata" in search box).

cuspidata
Edible nuts and seeds
Trees of Asia
Trees of Japan
Trees of South Korea